South Boston, formerly Boyd's Ferry, is a town in Halifax County, Virginia, United States. The population was 8,142 at the 2010 census, down from 8,491 at the 2000 census. It is the most populous town in Halifax County.

History 

On December 8, 1796, the Virginia General Assembly authorized eight commissioners to establish at Boyd's Ferry on the south side of the Dan River the town of South Boston, named for Boston, Massachusetts. Because this site proved vulnerable to flooding, it was eventually abandoned in favor of a new settlement on the north side. By the 1850s the Richmond and Danville Railroad passed through South Boston, which eventually developed into an important market for brightleaf tobacco. In 1884 it was incorporated as a town; in 1960 it became an independent city; and in 1995 it made history by being the first city in Virginia to revert to town status and rejoined Halifax County.

Within the town limits Berry Hill Plantation, E. L. Evans House, Reedy Creek Site, South Boston Historic District, are listed on the National Register of Historic Places. Fourqurean House, Glennmary, Glenwood, Tarover, and Seaton are nearby.

South Boston was home to the National Tobacco Festival (a typically three day annual festival held every Fall) from its inception in 1935 to 1941, when it was suspended during World War II. In 1948, the festival was moved to Richmond, Virginia when it outgrew the town. It was held in Richmond until 1984, when it was canceled due to rising production costs and decreased interest. South Boston was the second largest producer of tobacco in the United States until the Great Depression.

Geography
South Boston is located south of the center of Halifax County at  (36.707722, −78.903388). It is bordered to the south by the unincorporated community of Riverdale. U.S. Route 501 passes through the center of the town, leading north  to Halifax, the county seat, and south  to Roxboro, North Carolina. U.S. Route 360 crosses the southeast corner of the town limits, leading northeast  to Keysville and west  to Danville. U.S. Route 58 passes through the southernmost part of South Boston with US 360, leading west with it to Danville but running east  to South Hill.

The Dan River, a tributary of the Roanoke River, flows to the east along the southern edge of the town.

Climate

Major highways

Demographics

As of the census of 2000, there were 8,491 people, 3,502 households, and 2,185 families residing in the town. The population density was 694.7 people per square mile (268.3/km2). There were 3,946 housing units at an average density of 322.8 per square mile (124.7/km2). The racial makeup of the town was 50.63% White, 47.25% African American, 0.21% Native American, 0.48% Asian, 0.51% from other races, and 0.92% from two or more races. Hispanic or Latino of any race were 1.45% of the population.

There were 3,502 households, out of which 29.0% had children under the age of 18 living with them, 39.0% were married couples living together, 20.0% had a female householder with no husband present, and 37.6% were non-families. 34.9% of all households were made up of individuals, and 16.3% had someone living alone who was 65 years of age or older. The average household size was 2.26 and the average family size was 2.90.

In the town, the population was spread out, with 23.7% under the age of 18, 6.7% from 18 to 24, 25.1% from 25 to 44, 23.9% from 45 to 64, and 20.6% who were 65 years of age or older. The median age was 41 years. For every 100 females, there were 79.1 males. For every 100 females age 18 and over, there were 73.4 males.

The median income for a household in the town was $25,964, and the median income for a family was $34,848. Males had a median income of $28,212 versus $20,371 for females. The per capita income for the town was $15,872. About 15.3% of families and 20.4% of the population were below the poverty line, including 24.2% of those under age 18 and 23.9% of those age 65 or over.

Notable people 
 Jeremy Jeffress, former pitcher for the Milwaukee Brewers and Toronto Blue Jays
 Michael Tucker, Major League Baseball player
 William M. Tuck, 55th Governor of Virginia, born in Halifax County, Virginia and rests in South Boston.
 Walter B. Scates, Chief Justice of the Illinois Supreme Court and Illinois Attorney General, born in South Boston
 Burton Family of NASCAR. Ward and Jeff Burton, both brothers, are from South Boston and prepared for their racing career at South Boston Speedway. Their children Jeb (Ward) and Harrison (Jeff) are from the city as well.
 NFL player Tyrone Davis of the New York Jets and Green Bay Packers is from South Boston.
 Robert Llewellyn, born December 29, 1945, in Roanoke, Virginia, is a professional photographer who grew up in South Boston and now lives in Earlysville, Virginia.
 Grandmaster Slice, American hip-hop musician
 Greg Vanney, former professional soccer player and head coach of the LA Galaxy.
 G. C. Waldrep, poet and historian, was born and raised in South Boston.
 Olympic high jumper Tisha Waller is from South Boston.
 Jay Blackton, who won an Academy Award for Best Music, Scoring of a Musical Picture in Oklahoma!, is buried in South Boston.

See also 
 List of former counties, cities, and towns of Virginia

References

Further reading 
 Substantial Changes to Counties and County Equivalent Entities: 1970–Present United States Census Bureau

External links
 Town of South Boston official website
 Halifax County Department of Tourism
 History of Halifax County & South Boston
 South Boston News & Record
 The Gazette-Virginian
 Town records 1905–1999 online at Footnote.com

Towns in Virginia
Towns in Halifax County, Virginia
Populated places established in 1796
1796 establishments in Virginia